Yambuku is a small village in Mongala Province in northern Democratic Republic of the Congo. It was the center of the first documented outbreak of Ebola virus disease, in 1976, with the World Health Organization identifying a man from Yambuku as the index case.

During the 1976 Zaire Ebola virus outbreak, the village had no running water or electricity. The village had a hospital but no radio, phone, or ambulances, and communication was by motorbike messenger.

See also
 Western African Ebola virus epidemic
 Zaire ebolavirus

References

Populated places in Mongala
Ebola